The Ransom is a lost 1915 silent film  drama starring directed by Lawrence Edmund and starring Julia Dean. It was released by World Film Company.

Plot summary

Cast
 Julia Dean - Janet Osborne
 Louise Huff - Marcia Osborne
 J. Albert Hall - Mark Osborne (*as James Hall)
 Ethel Lloyd - Sarah Osborne
 Willard Case - Ellis Raymond
 Kenneth Hunter - Geoffrey Allen
 William McKey - (*as William Mackey)
 Lorna Volare -
 Adelaide Lawrence - 
 Evelyn Dumo -

References

External links
 The Ransom at IMDb.com
 
 

1915 films
American silent feature films
American black-and-white films
1910s English-language films
World Film Company films
Lost American films
Silent American drama films
1915 drama films
1915 lost films
Lost drama films
1910s American films